Courtney Ledyard (born March 9, 1977) is a former American football linebacker. He played for the New York Jets in 2000 and for the Montreal Alouettes in 2004.

References

1977 births
Living people
American football linebackers
Michigan State Spartans football players
New York Jets players
Rhein Fire players
Montreal Alouettes players